Edwin Briggs McNichol  (January 10, 1879 – November 1, 1952) was a Major League Baseball pitcher. He played a single year, 1904, for the Boston Beaneaters. He died in a house fire in 1952.

References

External links

Major League Baseball pitchers
Boston Beaneaters players
Baseball players from Ohio
1879 births
1952 deaths
Wheeling Stogies players
People from Martins Ferry, Ohio
Deaths from fire in the United States
Accidental deaths in Ohio